Richard Nixon, the 37th President of the United States, has inspired or been portrayed in numerous cultural works.

Literature
Our Gang, a 1971 novel by Philip Roth
The Public Burning, a 1977 novel by Robert Coover
Watchmen, a 1986 comic book by Alan Moore
Transmetropolitan, a 1997–2004 series of comics, where one of US presidents 'The Beast' looks like Richard Nixon.

Film
18½, a 2021 comedy thriller about the 18½-minute gap in the Nixon White House tapes
All the President's Men, a 1976 political thriller about the Watergate scandal
Black Dynamite, a 2009 American blaxploitation action comedy film
The Butler, a 2013 biopic about White House butler Eugene Allen
Dick, a 1999 comedy film that parodies the Watergate scandal
Elvis & Nixon, a 2016 comedy-drama film that focuses on the December 21, 1970, meeting between the two men at the White House
Forrest Gump, a 1994 film
Frost/Nixon, 2008 film based on the eponymous play
J. Edgar, a 2011 biopic about J. Edgar Hoover
J. Edgar Hoover, a 1987 made-for-television film about Hoover
Millhouse, a 1971 documentary
Nixon, a 1995 biopic
Pawn Sacrifice, a 2014 biopic of Bobby Fischer
The Private Files of J. Edgar Hoover, a 1977 film
Secret Honor, a 1984 film
Watchmen, a 2009 super-hero movie
The Werewolf of Washington, a 1973 satire of Nixon's presidency
X-Men Days of Future Past, a 2014 super-hero movie

Television
Futurama featured a fictionalized version of Nixon as a recurring character, President of Earth. A headless Spiro Agnew is his vice president.
Nixon, as portrayed by Stuart Milligan, appeared in the Doctor Who sixth series episodes "The Impossible Astronaut" and "Day of the Moon".
Nixon appears in the season 1 episode "The Watergate Tape" of the NBC series Timeless, where he is portrayed by Sheldon Landry. In the episode, Lucy, Wyatt, and Rufus travel to June 7, 1972, to stop Flynn from using the Nixon tape with the 18 1/2-minute gap and someone called the "Doc" to reveal Nixon's involvement with Rittenhouse.
Nixon, as portrayed by Paul Ganus, appeared in the Legends of Tomorrow fourth series episode "The Getaway".
Nixon was portrayed by Lane Smith, in the television movie The Final Days based on a book by Bob Woodward and Carl Bernstein. The television movie was released in 1989 and nominated for four Primetime Emmy awards.

Slow Burn, an Epix documentary

Music and stage production

Hundreds of songs have been released about or referencing Richard Nixon, with a significant portion focused on the Watergate scandal. Many songs also focus on the Vietnam War, as identified by the Vietnam War Song Project. Music historian Justin Brummer writes that in 1968 "Richard Nixon won the election and soon became the focus of protest". This included songs about the Moratorium to End the War in Vietnam, the Kent State shootings, the Pentagon Papers, and the Silent majority.

Stage productions include:
Frost/Nixon, a 2006 play about The Nixon Interviews
Nixon in China, a 1987 opera about Richard Nixon's 1972 visit to China

References